George Dempster may refer to:

 George Dempster of Dunnichen (1732–1818), Scots lawyer and member of Parliament
 George Roby Dempster (1887–1964), American industrialist, inventor and mayor
 George Dempster (footballer), Australian rules footballer